Tresibaba (Serbian Cyrillic: Тресибаба) is a mountain in southeastern Serbia, between the towns of Svrljig and Knjaževac. Its highest peak Čukar has an elevation of 826 meters above sea level.

References

Mountains of Serbia